"I Am" is a single by singer/songwriter Mark Schultz. It is also Schultz's first single not to be on one of his studio albums, appearing on his live album, Live: A Night of Stories & Songs.

This song was also appears of the WOW Hits 2007 compilation album.

Background
This song was introduced during Schultz's live show, A Night of Stories & Songs. He states that he felt God in the room when he wrote the song. He also performed the song on the CD/DVD Broken & Beautiful: Expanded Edition in a live segment.

Charts
The song has gained success throughout the years. It peaked at #3 on the Hot Christian Songs chart.

Chart positions

References

2006 songs